Nathan Burns (born 7 May 1988) is a retired Australian professional footballer who last played for Wellington Phoenix in the A-League and the Australian national team.

Club career

Adelaide United
He formerly played for Parramatta Eagles and trained at the AIS.

After a few substitute appearances for Adelaide United, Burns finally got his first start against Sydney FC scoring his first A-League goal in the 4–1 loss. On 21 January 2007 Burns scored Adelaide United's first ever hat trick during a match against Central Coast Mariners, giving his side a 2nd-place finish on the league table to close out the 2nd A-League season.

After his great season with Adelaide United, Norwegian champions SK Brann invited Burns for a 10-day trial where he would train with fellow Socceroo Michael Thwaite.

AEK Athens

On 10 June 2008, he signed with AEK Athens on a four-year contract. He wore the number 24 shirt.

Burns made his Greek Super League debut for AEK Athens on 28 February 2009, as 65th-minute substitute against Skoda Xanthi at the Spyros Louis Olympic Stadium in Athens. Burns scored the winner against Rangers in the final game of the 2010 Sydney Festival of Football. He scored his first league goal on 27 February 2011, in a 3–2 away win against Ergotelis.

In August 2009, he was loaned out to Beta Ethniki side Kerkyra on a one-year loan deal.

Although he was brought from Australia as a promising youngster, he never fulfilled his potential. On 19 January 2012 he terminated his contract with AEK.

Incheon United
He joined Korean club Incheon United on 25 January 2012.

Burns was on loan with Australian side Newcastle Jets in the A-League from 25 July 2013 until 11 January 2014, playing 12 games and scoring a brace.

Wellington Phoenix
On 25 June 2014 it was announced that he had signed a 2-year deal to join New Zealand team Wellington Phoenix in the A-League beginning with the 2014/15 season.
On 18 October 2014, he scored his debut goal for the club against Central Coast Mariners. Burns made history in the Round 8 clash against Melbourne City, becoming the first Phoenix player to score a hat trick in their 5–1 victory.
On 6 December he scored his 8th goal of the season in a 3–1 come from behind victory over Newcastle Jets at Hunter Stadium.  On 21 December he scored two goals in a 2–0 away win over Sydney FC, making him the fastest A-league player to ever reach 10 goals in a season, and did not return to New Zealand as he got his international recall for Australia ahead of the Asian Cup.

FC Tokyo
In July Burns left the A-League for J1 League club FC Tokyo.

Sanfrecce Hiroshima
Following speculation of Burns returning to the A-League following the end of his contract at FC Tokyo, he stayed in Japan, joining Sanfrecce Hiroshima on 13 July 2017.

Return to Wellington Phoenix
On 30 December 2017 it was announced that Nathan Burns would be returning to Wellington Phoenix on a two-year contract. Burns was not offered a contract renewal and was released by the club following the conclusion of the 2018–19 A-League season.

International career

Youth
He competed for the Joeys at 2005 FIFA U-17 World Championship in Peru.

He scored his first goal for the Young Socceroos in the AFC Youth Cup in a 3–1 win over Thailand.

Senior
He made his debut for the Socceroos with a brief appearance in the 3–0 win over Singapore on 30 June 2007.

Burns came on as a substitute in the opening game in Melbourne of the 2015 AFC Asian Cup against Kuwait, and was twice denied a goal, the first when his shot hit the crossbar, and the second when the goalkeeper made a brilliant save.

On 17 January 2015, Burns made his first start for the Socceroos since 2011, when he lined up for the final group game of the 2015 AFC Asian Cup for Australia against South Korea.

On 3 September 2015, Burns scored his first goal for Australia, eight years after his senior debut, scoring in a 5–0 defeat of Bangladesh in a 2018 FIFA World Cup qualifier.

Career statistics

Club

International
{| class="wikitable" style="text-align:center"
! colspan=3 | Australia national team
|-
!Year!!Apps!!Goals
|-
| 2007
| 1
| 0
|-
| 2008
| 1
| 0
|-
| 2010
| 2
| 0
|-
| 2011
| 3
| 0
|-
| 2012
| 1
| 0
|-
| 2015
| 10
| 1
|-
| 2016
| 6
| 2
|-
! Total
! 24
! 3

International Goals 

Scores and results list Australia's goal tally first.

Honours

Club
AEK Athens
Greek Cup: 2010–11

International
Australia
 AFC Asian Cup: 2015

Individual
 Rising Star Award: 2006-07
 Wellington Phoenix Player of the Year: 2014–15
 Johnny Warren Medal: 2014–15
 A-League PFA Team of the Season: 2014–15

References

External links
 
 OzFootball profile

 
 
 
 

1988 births
Living people
Australian soccer players
Australia international soccer players
Australian expatriate soccer players
Australian Institute of Sport soccer players
AEK Athens F.C. players
Adelaide United FC players
Association football forwards
A-League Men players
Expatriate footballers in Greece
Super League Greece players
A.O. Kerkyra players
Parramatta FC players
Incheon United FC players
K League 1 players
Expatriate footballers in South Korea
Australian expatriate sportspeople in South Korea
2011 AFC Asian Cup players
2015 AFC Asian Cup players
New South Wales Institute of Sport alumni
Newcastle Jets FC players
Australia under-20 international soccer players
Wellington Phoenix FC players
J1 League players
J3 League players
FC Tokyo players
FC Tokyo U-23 players
Sanfrecce Hiroshima players
AFC Asian Cup-winning players
People from Orange, New South Wales
Sportsmen from New South Wales
Soccer players from New South Wales